Highland High School is a public high school in Granger Township, Ohio, United States, near Medina. The school serves students from Hinckley, Granger, Sharon, Montville, Copley, Medina, and Brunswick townships. In 2021, Highland High School was raked #881 nationally and #34 in Ohio by U.S. News “Best Schools”.

It is the only high school in the Highland Local School District. The school colors are kelly green and black, and athletic teams are known as the Hornets.  The alma mater is to the tune of "Carmen Ohio" and the fight song is the "Notre Dame Victory March".

Highland High School is a comprehensive high school with approximately 1,037 students in grades 9–12 as of the 2020–2021 school year.

Athletics
Highland High School competes in the Ohio High School Athletic Association (OHSAA) as a member of the Suburban League American Conference. In the late 1970s and early 1980s the Hornets wrestling team was a regular state championship contender, winning the Division II state title in 1975 and 1981. The girls' volleyball team won the Division II state championship in 1981.   
 
In December 2013, after many years of planning, the Highland Board of Education revealed plans for a new athletic complex. This complex includes a football stadium featuring a turf field, eight lane track, locker room facilities, multiple restroom facilities, multiple food vending facilities, a video scoreboard, and seating for 5,000 people. The complex also features tennis courts, and additional parking areas. The stadium was constructed on land that was being used as a practice field for the marching band, and the tennis courts were constructed west of the new stadium where a wooded area was previously. This project is projected to cost seven to eight million dollars with most of the funding coming from private sources. The complex was completed in August 2015.

The final varsity football game was played at the original Highland Stadium located at Highland Middle School on October 17, 2014, against Revere High School. The game resulted in a 24–10 victory for Highland and included a number of special events. Since 2015, this stadium is used for the practices of several sports programs and for middle school sports home games.

Notable alumni 
 Luke Raley, Professional baseball player
 Matt Tifft, American professional stock car racing driver.
 Jim Ritcher, Buffalo Bills center
 Daryl Morey, general manager for the Houston Rockets.

Notes and references

7. MC-GIS http://gm.medinaco.org/ Retrieved February 4, 2022

External links
 

High schools in Medina County, Ohio
Public high schools in Ohio